Plomestane (former developmental code name MDL-18962; also known as propargylestrenedione, PED) is a steroidal, irreversible aromatase inhibitor which was under development by Marion Merrell Dow/Hoechst Marion Russell (now Hoechst AG) as an antineoplastic agent for the treatment of breast cancer. It was found to be effective in preclinical studies and was also found to produce few adverse effects in human clinical trials, significantly reducing estrogen levels with a single administration. However, development of the drug for clinical use was halted due to "technical issues" and it was never marketed.

In addition to its activity as an aromatase inhibitor, plomestane has weak androgenic properties.

See also
 Minamestane

References

Androgens and anabolic steroids
Androstanes
Antiestrogens
Aromatase inhibitors
Hormonal antineoplastic drugs
Propargyl compounds